Bush Mama is an American film made by Ethiopian-American director Haile Gerima, part of the L.A. Rebellion movement of political and experimental black cinema in the 1970s.  It was released in 1979 though made earlier, in 1975.

In 2022, it was selected for preservation in the National Film Registry by the Library of Congress deeming it "culturally, historically or aesthetically significant."

Making
The film was made by Gerima as his thesis project at the University of California at Los Angeles, shot on a small budget.  It was directed, produced and edited by Gerima with cinematography by Roderick Young and Charles Burnett.

The first half is filmed in a cinema vérité style, making heavy use of improvisation, while the second half moves away from naturalism towards a Godardian agit prop approach.

Plot
Bush Mama is the story of Dorothy and her husband T.C. He is a discharged Vietnam veteran who thought he would return home to a "hero's welcome." Instead, he is falsely arrested and imprisoned for a crime he didn't commit. Her life revolves around the welfare office and a community facing poverty and unemployment. As a result of the film's events, both the main characters become radicalized and Dorothy eventually turns to violence.

Cast
 Barbarao (as Barbara O. Jones) - Dorothy
 Johnny Weathers - T.C.
 Susan Williams - Luann
 Cora Lee Day - Molly
 Simmi Ella Nelson - Simmi
 Bettie J. Wilson - Social Worker
 Bob Ogburn Jr. - Dahomey man
 Ben Collins - Ben
 Renna Kraft - Angi
 Darian Gibbs - Young Street Boy
 Minnie Stewart - 1st Welfare Recipient
 Malbertha Pickett - 2nd Welfare Recipient
 Bertha Yates - Secretary
 Chris Clay - Policeman
 Charles David Brooks III - Preacher

Critical reception
The film received "wide critical acclaim" and was "showcased at many major international film festivals."  The New York Times called it "fiery, furious, overflowing with rhetoric and slightly out of breath", praising the main actors but saying the director's fierce polemic sometime overwhelms the dramatic aspects of the film.

See also
 L.A. Rebellion
 Cinema of Ethiopia

References

External links
 Bush Mama at Sankofa.com

1979 films
1979 drama films
African-American films
Films directed by Haile Gerima
American student films
1970s English-language films
United States National Film Registry films